Haskell County is a county located in the southeast quadrant of the U.S. state of Oklahoma. As of the 2020 census, the population was 12,652. Its county seat is Stigler. The county is named in honor of Charles N. Haskell, the first governor of Oklahoma.

History
The area now comprising Haskell County was created at statehood primarily from the former Sans Bois County of the Choctaw Nation in Indian Territory. Sans Bois County was part of the Moshulatubbee District, one of three administrative super-regions comprising the Choctaw Nation.  Small portions of present-day Haskell County fell within Gaines County and Skullyville County, Choctaw Nation.

In 1908 county voters picked Stigler over Keota and Whitefield as the county seat.

Underground coal mining was undertaken here in the early 20th century, creating jobs and attracting railroad construction to southern Haskell County. The San Bois Coal Company built more than four hundred company houses in McCurtain and Chant (two towns that eventually merged into one) for their miners. In 1912 a large, underground explosion rocked the Number Two mine at McCurtain, killing 73 (seventy-three) miners and bankrupting the San Bois Company. The McCurtain disaster and the declining demand for coal in the 1920s halted underground coal mining in the county.

Strip mining continued. The Lone Star Steel Company became the county's leading coal producer. Haskell County was the source of 20 percent of Oklahoma's coal production between 1950 and 1980.

Agriculture was the most important component of the county economy in the early 20th century. Cotton was the most important crop, followed by corn and oats. The collapse of cotton prices and the Great Depression caused a drop in population as well as farm acreage. In 1934 the Federal Emergency Relief Administration helped over 85 percent of Haskell County's population. Ranching supplanted farming, which was forced to diversify. By 1964, livestock accounted for about 70 percent of the county's revenues.

Geography

The relatively large water area results from the presence of Eufaula Lake and the Robert S. Kerr Reservoir. The South Canadian River forms the northern border with McIntosh and Muskogee counties before draining into the Arkansas River at the Robert S. Kerr Reservoir. The Arkansas is the northeastern border with Sequoyah County.

Major highways
  State Highway 2
  State Highway 9
  State Highway 31
  State Highway 71
  State Highway 82

Adjacent counties
 Muskogee County (north)
 Sequoyah County (northeast)
 Le Flore County (east)
 Latimer County (south)
 Pittsburg County (west)
 McIntosh County (northwest)

National protected area
 Sequoyah National Wildlife Refuge (part)

Demographics

As of the 2010 United States Census, there were 12,769 people living in the county. 74.9% were White, 15.9% Native American, 0.5% Asian, 0.4% Black or African American, 1.2% of some other race and 7.0% of two or more races. 3.3% were Hispanic or Latino (of any race). 8.4% were of American, 7.3% German, 6.4% Irish and 5.0% English ancestry.

As of the census of 2000, there were 11,792 people, 4,624 households, and 3,380 families living in the county.  The population density was 20 people per square mile (8/km2).  There were 5,573 housing units at an average density of 10 per square mile (4/km2).  The racial makeup of the county was 78.24% White, 0.61% Black or African American, 14.60% Native American, 0.29% Asian, 0.45% from other races, and 5.81% from two or more races.  1.50% of the population were Hispanic or Latino of any race.

There were 4,624 households, out of which 31.70% had children under the age of 18 living with them, 60.60% were married couples living together, 9.10% had a female householder with no husband present, and 26.90% were non-families. 24.70% of all households were made up of individuals, and 13.00% had someone living alone who was 65 years of age or older.  The average household size was 2.52 and the average family size was 3.00.

In the county, the population was spread out, with 26.00% under the age of 18, 8.10% from 18 to 24, 24.50% from 25 to 44, 24.20% from 45 to 64, and 17.20% who were 65 years of age or older.  The median age was 39 years. For every 100 females there were 95.70 males.  For every 100 females age 18 and over, there were 92.40 males.

The median income for a household in the county was $24,553, and the median income for a family was $29,872. Males had a median income of $25,493 versus $17,462 for females. The per capita income for the county was $13,775.  About 16.10% of families and 20.50% of the population were below the poverty line, including 25.10% of those under age 18 and 18.60% of those age 65 or over.

Politics
Despite the county being home to a significant Native American population and a wide Democratic registration advantage, the county has not voted that way in presidential elections in the 21st century. Unlike other Native-administered counties, however, the rightward shift only increased after the 2004 election, with the GOP hitting well over 70% of the vote in the county in the Barack Obama era and topping out with 83.1% for Donald Trump in 2020.

Communities

City
 Stigler (county seat)

Towns
 Keota
 Kinta
 McCurtain
 Tamaha
 Whitefield

Census-designated places
 Enterprise
 Hoyt
 Lequire

Haskell County Courthouse
Stigler is home to the Haskell County Courthouse, which has become notable for erecting marble statues of the Ten Commandments and the Mayflower Compact on the front lawn (see Separation of church and state in the United States).  In the seventh commandment, the word "adultery" is misspelled.

A unanimous federal appeals court ruled that county commissioners in Haskell County, Oklahoma unconstitutionally sought to promote their personal religious beliefs by erecting a Ten Commandments monument on the front lawn of the county's courthouse. The decision by the U.S. Tenth Circuit Court of Appeals comes in a challenge filed by the American Civil Liberties Union and the ACLU of Oklahoma on behalf of a local resident.

After the court decision, the marble statue was moved approximately 600 feet east to private property.  Therefore, the statue was still displayed on the main street, available to anyone who desired to view and read the information.

NRHP sites

The following sites in Haskell County are listed on the National Register of Historic Places:
 Cotton Storage House, Kinta
 Haskell County Courthouse, Stigler
 Kinta High School, Kinta
 McCurtain, Edmund, House, Kinta
 McCurtain, Green, House, Kinta
 Mule Creek Site, Stigler
 Otter Creek Archeological Site, Keota
 Scott Store, Kinta
 Stigler School Gymnasium--Auditorium, Stigler
 Tamaha Jail and Ferry Landing, Stigler

References

External links
 Encyclopedia of Oklahoma History and Culture - Haskell County
 Oklahoma Digital Maps: Digital Collections of Oklahoma and Indian Territory

 
1907 establishments in Oklahoma
Populated places established in 1907